Albertson is a station on the Long Island Rail Road's Oyster Bay Branch. The station is on the north side of I.U. Willets Road at Albertson Avenue in Albertson, New York. However the parking lot is on the south side of I.U. Willets Road. The Clark Botanic Garden is located adjacent to the station.

History
The station was originally opened with name Albertson's and originally opened as a milk station in March 1874 and opened as a flag stop in June 1875 by the Glen Cove Branch Rail Road. The station was renamed as Albertson in 1903. The station had a depot building built in 1911, and it lasted until 1954, when it was razed. In 1960, the LIRR planned to close the station as well as East Williston station and replace them both with a single station between the two sites. However public opposition to the proposal cancelled those plans. Between fall 1997 and fall 1998, high-level concrete platforms were built and ramps were installed.

Station layout
The station has two slightly offset high-level side platforms, each four cars long.

References

External links

Albertson Station (Unofficial LIRR History Website)
 Station from I.U. Willets Road from Google Maps Street View
Platforms from Google Maps Street View

Long Island Rail Road stations in Nassau County, New York
Railway stations in the United States opened in 1875